Murder in the Blue Room is a 1944 American film directed by Leslie Goodwins.

Plot
A musical mystery about a young couple's attempt to solve a mysterious murder that occurred at their house.

Cast
 Anne Gwynne as Nan
 John Litel as Frank Baldrich
 Grace McDonald as Peggy
 Donald Cook as Steve
 June Preisser as Jerry
 Betty Kean as Betty
 Regis Toomey as Inspector McDonald
 Nella Walker as Dorothy Craig
 Andrew Tombes as Dr. Carroll

Background
It is the second remake of the 1933 American Pre-Code murder-mystery film Secret of the Blue Room, the first being Universal's 1938 remake, The Missing Guest. Faithful to the original plot, Murder in the Blue Room plays up the comedy with songs. The plot is based on the 1932 German film Secret of the Blue Room.

References

External links

1944 films
American mystery films
1944 mystery films
American black-and-white films
1940s English-language films
Films directed by Leslie Goodwins
1940s American films